Nanbanin Kadhali ( Friend's lover) is a 2007 Indian Tamil-language romantic drama film written and directed by G. Kicha, starring Vikramaditya, Kunal, Shivani Singh and Vinu Chakravarthy. The film had been shot and completed in 2005 under the title Cleopatra, but only released in 2007.  The film is inspired from Telugu film Nee Premakai. This is Kunal's last Tamil film release before his death in 2008.

Plot
Jeeva who takes up residence in Sujata's neighbourhood, falls for her ample charms. Jeeva's attempts to woo Suji misfires, landing him on the wrong side of her father, a retired military man. Enters into the scene Surya. Surya's smooth talking ways and pleasing manners charm Suji and her family. In the game of one-upmanship and misunderstandings, who finally gets the girl forms the finale.

Cast
 Vikramaditya as Jeeva
 Kunal as Suryaprakash aka Surya, Jeeva's childhood friend
 Shivani Singh as Sujatha (Suji)
 Vinu Chakravarthy as Sujatha's father
 Nirosha as Sujatha's mother
 R. Thyagarajan
 Vaiyapuri
 Kalpana Shree

Production
The film began production in 2005 under the title Cleopatra, the filming was held at Goa and Visakhapatnam for 40 days.

Soundtrack 
The music for the film was scored by Deva and lyrics were written by Yugabharathi.

References

External links 
 

2007 films
2000s Tamil-language films
Indian romantic drama films
Films scored by Deva (composer)
Films shot in Goa
Films shot in Visakhapatnam
2007 romantic drama films